The 1985 Calgary Stampeders finished in 5th place in the West Division with a 3–13 record and failed to make the playoffs.

Regular season

Season standings

Season schedule

Awards and records

1985 CFL All-Stars
None

References

Calgary Stampeders seasons
1985 Canadian Football League season by team